Pant (Salop) railway station was a station in Pant, Shropshire, England. The station was opened in February 1862 and closed on 18 January 1965.

References

Further reading

Disused railway stations in Shropshire
Railway stations in Great Britain opened in 1862
Railway stations in Great Britain closed in 1965
Former Cambrian Railway stations
Beeching closures in England